Empress Xia Shenfu (1136 – 13 July 1167) was a Chinese empress consort of the Song dynasty, married to Emperor Xiaozong of Song.

Xia originally served as a maid to the first spouse of Xiaozong, who died in 1156 when he was still prince. In 1162, he married Xia as his second main spouse, and in 1163, he gave her the title of empress. She had one son and one daughter, both of whom died very young.

Notes

Sources 

1136 births
1167 deaths
Song dynasty empresses
Year of birth unknown
12th-century Chinese women
12th-century Chinese people